Hadrotarsus fulvus is a species of comb-footed spider in the family Theridiidae. It is found in Tasmania.

References

Theridiidae
Spiders described in 1943
Spiders of Australia